Indigenous All-Stars may refer to:
Indigenous All-Stars (Australian football), a representative Australian rules football team made up of indigenous Australian players
Indigenous All-Stars (rugby league), a representative rugby league football team made up of indigenous Australian players